The 2009 Gold Coast Titans season was the third in the club's history. They competed in the National Rugby League's 2009 Telstra Premiership, finishing the regular season 3rd (out of 16), and for the first time reached the finals only to be knocked out by eventual grand finalists, the Parramatta Eels.

Fixtures

Trial matches

Regular season
Source:

Records

Most Points
182 - Scott Prince (7 tries, 77 goals)
58 - Mat Rogers (11 tries, 7 goals)
52 - Kevin Gordon (13 tries)
32 - Chris Walker (8 tries)
32 - David Mead (8 tries)

Most Tries
13 - Kevin Gordon
11 - Mat Rogers
8 - Chris Walker
8 - David Mead
7 - Scott Prince
6 - Luke O'Dwyer
6 - Esi Tonga
5 - Anthony Laffranchi
5 - Preston Campbell

Most Points in a Match
20 - Scott Prince Round 25 (2 tries, 6 goals)
14 - Scott Prince Round 20 (1 try, 5 goals)
14 - Scott Prince Round 22 (1 try, 5 goals)
10 - Mat Rogers Round 4 (5 goals)

Most Tries in a Match
2 - Brad Meyers Round 13
2 - Kevin Gordon Round 16
2 - David Mead Round 16
2 - David Mead Round 17
2 - Mat Rogers Round 19
2 - Mat Rogers Round 22

Available 2009 Players
Bold Players have played International or State any year

Full Backs   
 Preston Campbell
 William Zillman

Wingers     
 Jordan Atkins
 Ben Jeffery
 Brenton Bowen
 Shannon Walker
 Chris Walker
 Kevin Gordon
 David Mead

Centres    
 Brett Delaney
 Josh Graham
 Esi Tonga

Halves   
 Scott Prince (c)
 Mat Rogers
 Brad Davis
 Jackson Nicolau
 Jordan Rankin

Hookers      
 Nathan Friend
 Ian Lacey
 Kayne Lawton

Props        
 Luke Bailey (c)
 Brad Meyers
 Michael Henderson
 Matthew White
 Aaron Cannings
 Selasi Berdie
 Will Matthews
 Bodene Thompson
 Siosaia Vave

Second Rowers/Locks      
 Anthony Laffranchi
 Mark Minichiello
 Ashley Harrison
 Luke O'Dwyer
 Daniel Conn
 Sam Tagataese

2009 Squad

Player Transfers
Source: 2009 NRL PLayer Movements

Gains

Losses

Off Contract
Chris Walker

Brenton Bowen

Ben Jeffery

Ladder

References 

 2009 NRL PLayer Movements

External links
Gold Coast Titans: Season Review - NRL.com

Gold Coast Titans seasons
Gold Coast Titans season